"Fugue for Tinhorns" is a song written and composed by Frank Loesser and first performed by Stubby Kaye, Johnny Silver, and Douglas Deane in 1950. The song was featured in the Broadway musical Guys and Dolls.

Development
Twelve years before writing "Fugue for Tinhorns," Loesser was taken to a racetrack by Jule Styne, who said Loesser "was crazy about the racing form and the phrase 'can do' after a horse's name," which Styne said was Loesser's inspiration for the song.

Loesser originally called the song "Three Cornered Tune," and it was to be sung in Guys and Dolls by the characters Sarah Brown, Nathan Detroit, and Sky Masterson.  As the play took shape, the characters singing the song were changed to Nicely-Nicely Johnson, Benny Southstreet, and Rusty Charlie, and the song was placed at the beginning of the show to establish context and tone.

Notable recordings
The Andrews Sisters recorded the song as a single in 1953.
Frank Sinatra, Bing Crosby, and Dean Martin recorded the song as a single in 1963.
Herschel Bernardi recorded the song as a track on his 1970 album "Show Stopper."
Barry Manilow recorded the song as part of a Guys and Dolls medley on his 1991 album "Showstoppers."
Big Scoob sampled the song for his recording, "Can Du", in 2000.

In popular culture
Film

The song was included in the 1955 Guys and Dolls film adaptation.

References

External links
[ Allmusic Entry]

Songs from Guys and Dolls
Songs from musicals
Songs written by Frank Loesser
Pop standards